This page includes a list of biblical proper names that start with E in English transcription. Some of the names are given with a proposed etymological meaning. For further information on the names included on the list, the reader may consult the sources listed below in the References and External Links.

A – B – C – D – E – F – G – H – I – J – K – L – M – N – O – P – Q – R – S – T – U – V – Y – Z

E
Ebal
Ebed
Ebed-melech
Eben-Ezer
Eber
Ebiasaph
Ebronah
Ecclesiastes
Ecclesiasticus, or the Wisdom of Sirach 
Ed
Eden
Eder
Edom
Edrei
Eglah
Eglaim
Eglon
Egypt 
Ehi
Ehud
Eker
Ekron
Eladah
Elah
Elam
Elasah
Elath
El-beth-el
Eldaah
Eldad
Elead
Elealeh
Eleasah
Eleazar
El-elohe-Israel
Eleph
Elhanan son of Dodo
Elhanan son of Jair
Eli
Eliab
Eliada
Eliah
Eliahba
Eliakim
Eliam
Elias
Eliasaph
Eliashib
Eliathah
Elidad
Eliel
Elienai
Eliezer
Elihoreph
Elihu
Elijah
Elika
Elim
Elimelech
Elioenai
Eliphal
Eliphaz
Eliphelet
Elizabeth
Elisha
Elishah
Elishama
Elishaphat
Elisheba
Elishua
Eliud
Elizur
Elkanah
Ellasar
Elkoshite
Elm
Elmodam
Elnaam
Elnathan
Elon
Elon-beth-hanan
Elpaal
Elpalet
Eltekeh
Eltolad
Elul
Eluzai
Elymas
Elzabad
Elzaphan
Emims
Emmanuel
Emmaus
Emmor
Enan
En-dor
Eneas
En-eglaim
En-gannim
En-gedi
En-haddah
En-hakkore
En-hazor
En-mishpat
Enoch
Enon
Enos
En-rimmon
En-rogel
En-shemesh
En-tappuah
Epaphras
Epaphroditus
Epenetus
Ephah
Epher
Ephes-dammim
Ephesus
Ephlal
Ephphatha
Ephraim
Ephratah
Ephron
Epicurean
Er
Eran
Erastus
Eri
Esaias
Esar-haddon
Esau
Esek
Eshbaal
Eshban
Eshcol
Eshean
Eshek
Eshkalon
Eshtaol
Eshtemoa
Esli
Esrom
Esther
Etam
Etham
Ethan
Ethanim
Ethbaal
Ethiopia
Ethnan
Ethni
Eubulus
Eunice
Euodias
Euphrates
Eutychus
Eve
Evi
Evil-merodach
Exodus
Ezbon
Ezekiel
Ezel
Ezem
Ezer
Ezion-Geber
Ezra
Ezri
Eva

References
Comay, Joan, Who's Who in the Old Testament, Oxford University Press, 1971,  
Lockyer, Herbert, All the men of the Bible, Zondervan Publishing House (Grand Rapids, Michigan), 1958
Lockyer, Herbert, All the women of the Bible, Zondervan Publishing 1988, 
Lockyer, Herbert, All the Divine Names and Titles in the Bible, Zondervan Publishing 1988,  
Tischler, Nancy M., All things in the Bible: an encyclopedia of the biblical world , Greenwood Publishing, Westport, Conn. : 2006

Inline references
 

E